Muhammad Sadiq (born 1 September 1934) is a Pakistani boxer. He competed in the men's flyweight event at the 1976 Summer Olympics.

References

1934 births
Living people
Pakistani male boxers
Olympic boxers of Pakistan
Boxers at the 1976 Summer Olympics
Place of birth missing (living people)
Asian Games medalists in boxing
Boxers at the 1978 Asian Games
Asian Games bronze medalists for Pakistan
Medalists at the 1978 Asian Games
Flyweight boxers
20th-century Pakistani people